William P. Rodgers (born October 8, 1994) is an American professional stock car racing driver. He last competed part-time in the NASCAR Xfinity Series, driving the No. 33 Toyota Supra for Reaume Brothers Racing, the No. 13 Toyota Supra for MBM Motorsports and part-time in the NASCAR Camping World Truck Series driving the No. 33 for RBR. He has also raced in the ARCA Menards Series, ARCA Menards Series West, NASCAR K&N Pro Series East, and Pirelli World Challenge.

Racing career

2016: West Series debut
After racing in the Pirelli World Challenge, Rodgers began racing in the NASCAR K&N Pro Series West in 2016, driving for team owner Dave Hanson. He made his debut at Sonoma Raceway, finishing in 17th. He ended the season with four top-ten finishes.

2017: Breakthrough with Kevin Harvick

Rodgers returned to the series in 2017, running full-time in the K&N Pro Series West for Jefferson Pitts Racing. He opened the season with four consecutive top-five finishes. At Sonoma, Rodgers qualified on pole position, earning his first career pole in the series. While he led early, Rodgers was eventually passed by 2014 NASCAR Sprint Cup Series champion Kevin Harvick, finishing second. Rodgers said after the race, "For some funny reason, I had a feeling as far back as four weeks ago that it was going to be me and Kevin coming into turn 11 on the last lap. And sure enough, there we were. He ran a really good race, I learned a lot from him. We were able to lead some laps there in the beginning. It doesn't feel too bad to finish second today." Harvick, meanwhile, was impressed with Rodgers' performance, stating, "That was really what this was all about, to shine a little light on a kid like Will and race against him and give him the recognition he deserves. I want to keep supporting the series and bring that bright light on some of these kids who need the opportunity." The race became a turning point for Rodgers' career; in May 2018, Autoweek writer Matt Weaver argued that Rodgers had "gained more from his graceful defeat than if he had won the race without the participation of a Cup Series veteran." Rodgers spoke of the race as having done "wonders for my career. We got a lot of attention....I can't say enough about how helpful Kevin was. He put me on his radio show and told the world that he respected me. That was huge." Rodgers ran the rest of the season for Pitts' team, adding another second-place finish at Evergreen Speedway.

Rodgers also ran the two road course races in the 2017 NASCAR K&N Pro Series East season. Rodgers earned his first career K&N Series win at Watkins Glen International, holding off Rubén García Jr. after García hit the wall attempting to overtake him. After the race, Harvick, despite not participating in the event, visited Rodgers in Victory Lane to congratulate him on the win. Rodgers also won the second road course race of the season at New Jersey Motorsports Park.

2018: Road course dominance, ARCA debut

In 2018, Rodgers returned to Jefferson Pitts Racing for the K&N West season opener at Kern County Raceway Park. After finishing a disappointing 16th, Rodgers moved to Bob Farmer's team for the doubleheader at Tucson Speedway. He finished ninth and seventh in the first and second race respectively.

On June 16, Rodgers returned to the East Series to run again at New Jersey Motorsports Park. He won the race after qualifying second and leading 49 of the 55 laps, earning his third road course victory in four such races at the K&N level and establishing himself as one of the series' road course ringers. Two days before the race, Harvick reaffirmed his support for Rodgers and argued, "When the road course stuff shows up, Will is probably capable of being in an Xfinity race or a Cup race. In the right equipment on a road course, he'd be a top-10 competitor." The next week, Rodgers returned to Sonoma for the K&N West race; while Harvick did not enter the 2018 race, a total of five Cup Series drivers (Aric Almirola, William Byron, Daniel Suárez, Erik Jones, and Alex Bowman) did participate. Rodgers beat all of them, qualifying on the pole and winning his fourth consecutive road course race at the K&N level. Rodgers later joined Levin Racing for the race at Gateway Motorsports Park.

Before the 2018 ARCA Racing Series season-opener at Daytona International Speedway, Rodgers was also announced as a driver for Ken Schrader Racing for select races, including Daytona. The race was Rodgers' first on an oval track longer than one mile in length. At Daytona, Rodgers was involved in an accident in turn 4 on lap 21, which led to him finishing 25 laps down in 30th place. Rodgers then rebounded to finish eighth in his next race at Charlotte Motor Speedway. Later in the season, he set a new career-best finish with a sixth-place run at Michigan International Speedway.

2019: K&N return at Sonoma and Xfinity debut

Rodgers began the 2019 season on the sidelines (working on the business aspect of his career by recruiting sponsors) but returned to Levin Racing for the K&N Pro Series West race at Sonoma. He spent the week leading up to the event serving as a driver coach to fellow K&N Pro Series driver Hailie Deegan.

In July, Rodgers joined Brandonbilt Motorsports for his NASCAR Xfinity Series debut in the U.S. Cellular 250 at Iowa Speedway.

2021: Return to Xfinity Series
Rodgers returned to the Xfinity Series in June 2021 with Sam Hunt Racing on a three-race schedule at Nashville Superspeedway, the Indianapolis Motor Speedway road course, and the Charlotte Motor Speedway Roval.

Personal life
Rodgers was born in Maui, Hawaii and currently resides in Huntersville, North Carolina.

At the age of three, Rodgers was diagnosed with primary sclerosing cholangitis (PSC), a liver disease that resulted in numerous biopsies and colonoscopies during his youth. He runs the Will Rodgers Liver Health Foundation.

Motorsports career results

NASCAR
(key) (Bold – Pole position awarded by qualifying time. Italics – Pole position earned by points standings or practice time. * – Most laps led.)

Xfinity Series

Camping World Truck Series

K&N Pro Series East

ARCA Menards Series
(key) (Bold – Pole position awarded by qualifying time. Italics – Pole position earned by points standings or practice time. * – Most laps led.)

ARCA Menards Series West

 Season still in progress
 Driver ineligible for series points

Pirelli World Challenge results

 Season still in progress
 Ineligible for series points

References

External links
 
 
 NASCAR Next profile

1994 births
Living people
Racing drivers from Hawaii
NASCAR drivers
ARCA Menards Series drivers
People from Maui